A robotics simulator is a simulator used to create an application for a physical robot without depending on the physical machine, thus saving cost and time. In some case, such applications can be transferred onto a physical robot (or rebuilt) without modification.

The term robotics simulator can refer to several different robotics simulation applications. For example, in mobile robotics applications, behavior-based robotics simulators allow users to create simple worlds of rigid objects and light sources and to program robots to interact with these worlds. Behavior-based simulation allows for actions that are more biotic in nature when compared to simulators that are more binary, or computational. Also, behavior-based simulators may learn from mistakes and can demonstrate the anthropomorphic quality of tenacity.

One of the most popular applications for robotics simulators is for 3D modeling and rendering of a robot and its environment. This type of robotics software has a simulator that is a virtual robot, which can emulate the motion of a physical robot in a real work envelope. Some robotics simulators use a physics engine for more realistic motion generation of the robot. The use of a robotics simulator to develop a robotics control program is highly recommended regardless of whether a physical robot is available or not. The simulator allows for robotics programs to be conveniently written and debugged off-line with the final version of the program tested on a physical robot. This applies mainly to industrial robotic applications, since the success of off-line programming depends on how similar the physical environment of a robot is to a simulated environment.

Sensor-based robot actions are much more difficult to simulate and/or to program off-line, since the robot motion depends on instantaneous sensor readings in the real world.

Features 
Modern simulators tend to provide the following features:
 Fast robot prototyping
 Using the own simulator as creation tool.
 Using external tools.
 Physics engines for realistic movements. Most simulators use Bullet, ODE or PhysX.
 Realistic 3d rendering. Standard 3d modeling tools or third-party tools can be used to build the environments.
 Dynamic robot bodies with scripting. C, C++, Perl, Python, Java, URBI, MATLAB languages used by Webots; C++ used by Gazebo.

Simulators
Among the newest technologies available today for programming are those which use a virtual simulation. Simulations with the use of virtual models of the working environment and the robots themselves can offer advantages to both the company and programmer. By using a simulation, costs are reduced, and robots can be programmed off-line which eliminates any down-time for an assembly line. Robot actions and assembly parts can be visualised in a 3-dimensional virtual environment months before prototypes are even produced. Writing code for a simulation is also easier than writing code for a physical robot. While the move toward virtual simulations for programming robots is a step forward in user interface design, many such applications are only in their infancy.

General information

Technical information

Infrastructure

Support

Code quality

Features

Robot families

Supported actuators

Supported sensors

References

External links 
 UWSim